The 1995 World Junior Ice Hockey Championships (1995 WJHC) was the 19th edition of the Ice Hockey World Junior Championship and was hosted in Red Deer, Alberta, Canada with games held throughout central Alberta.  The host Canadians won their third straight gold medal, and its eighth overall, while Russia won silver, and Sweden the Bronze

Final standings
The 1995 tournament was a round-robin format, with the top three teams winning gold, silver and bronze medals respectively. It was the last tournament, to use this round-robin format.

No team was relegated to Pool B as the tournament expanded to ten teams for 1996.

Results

Scoring leaders

Tournament awards

Pool B
Eight teams contested the second tier this year in Caen, Rouen, Le Havre, and Louviers France from December 27 to January 5.  It was played in a simple round robin format, each team playing seven games.  Two teams were promoted, no team was relegated because of the expansion of the top tier.

Standings

Qualification for Pool C1
This would be the final year for a pre-tournament qualification.  The winner of this tournament would participate in the C1 pool, second and third would participate in C2.  It was played from September 3 to 5, in Minsk, Belarus.

Pool C1
Eight teams were divided into two round robin groups, with placement games to follow (1st played 1st, etc.).  Because there were to be two teams promoted, each group winner secured promotion before the placement games.  The tournament took place from December 29 to January 3, in Puigcerda Spain.

Preliminary round
Group A

 was promoted to Pool B for 1996.

Group B

 was promoted to Pool B for 1996.

Placement Games
7th place: 4 - 3(ot) 
5th place: 3 - 2 
3rd place: 3 - 2 
1st Place: 5 - 2

Pool C2
Six teams played a round robin, with the top two gain promotion for the following year's Pool C, the remaining teams would be placed in Pool D.  It was played from December 31 to January 6, in Tallinn Estonia.

Standings

References

 
1995 World Junior Hockey Championships at TSN
http://www.passionhockey.com/hockeyarchives/U-20_1995.htm at Passionhockey.com

World Junior Ice Hockey Championships
World Junior Ice Hockey Championships
International ice hockey competitions hosted by Canada
December 1994 sports events in Canada
January 1995 sports events in Canada
Sports competitions in Red Deer, Alberta
Leduc, Alberta
Spruce Grove
1994 in Alberta
Ice hockey competitions in Calgary
1995 in Alberta
Sherwood Park
1990s in Calgary
Wetaskiwin
Lacombe, Alberta
Ponoka, Alberta
Ice hockey competitions in Edmonton
1990s in Edmonton
Sport in Caen
Sport in Rouen
Sport in Le Havre
International ice hockey competitions hosted by France
1994–95 in French ice hockey
1995 in Catalan sport
Sports competitions in Catalonia
International ice hockey competitions hosted by Spain
1994–95 in Spanish ice hockey
1994–95 in Estonian ice hockey
Sports competitions in Tallinn
International ice hockey competitions hosted by Estonia
1990s in Tallinn